This is a regrouping of the election results for cabinet ministers during the 2022 French legislative election.

Context 

On 20 May 2022, President Emmanuel Macron and Prime Minister Élisabeth Borne composed a government of 27 members. The Élysée announced in stride that all ministers which presented themselves in the legislative elections on 12–19 June 2022 would have to resign from their posts if they were not elected. 15 members of government are candidates include the Prime Minister, who is a candidate for the first time in Calvados's 6th constituency.

Non-candidate ministers 
Ministers who did not present themselves during the election included:
 Bruno Le Maire, Minister of the Economy, Finance and Industrial and Digital Sovereignty
 Catherine Colonna, Minister of Europe and Foreign Affairs
 Éric Dupond-Moretti, Minister of Justice, Keeper of the Seals
 Pap Ndiaye, Minister of National Education and Youth
 Sébastien Lecornu, Minister of the Armed Forces
 Sylvie Retailleau, Minister of Higher Education and Research
 Rima Abdul-Malak, Minister of Culture
 Agnès Pannier-Runacher, Minister of Ecological Transition
 Amélie Oudéa-Castéra, Minister of Sports and the Olympics and Paralympic Games
 Isabelle Lonvis-Rome, Minister Delegated for Equality between Women and Men, Diversity and Equal Opportunities
 Christophe Béchu, Secretary of State in charge of Territorial Development
 Charlotte Caubel, Secretary of State for Children
 Chrysoula Zacharopoulou, Secretary of State for Development, La Francophonie and International Partnerships

Results

First round 
Following the first round of voting on 12 June 2022, none of the candidates were elected or eliminated. Three ministers arrived in the second position of their respective constituencies and therefor entered the second round in an unfavourable position, they were: Clément Beaune, Stanislas Guerini and Amélie de Montchalin. The minister which obtained the best result was Gabriel Attal, with 48.06% of the vote.

Second round 
During the second round, Justine Benin was beaten in Guadeloupe's 2nd constituency by the NUPES candidate, Christian Baptiste (58.65% versus 41.35%), Brigitte Bourguignon was beaten by 56 votes in the Pas-de-Calais's 6th constituency by the RN candidate, Christine Engrand (50.06% versus 49.94%), and Amélie de Montchalin was beaten in Essonne's 6th constituency by the NUPES candidate, Jérôme Guedj, deputy of the slingers faction of the PS between 2012 and 2014 and losing candidate in the 2017 legislative elections (53.36% versus 46.63%). It is the first time since the defeat of Alain Juppé in 2007 that ministers in office lost a legislative election. According to the rule decreed by the Élysée, they are all required to resign their government portfolios.

Detailed table

See also 
 Candidates in the 2022 French legislative election
 List of MPs who lost their seat in the 2022 French legislative election
 Results of the 2022 French legislative election by constituency

References 

2022 French legislative election
Government ministers of France
Election results in France